Segestria  may refer to:
 Segestria (spider), a genus of spiders in the family Segestriidae
 Segestria (fungus), a genus of lichenized fungi in the family Porinaceae